Frank Sinatra Sings the Select Cole Porter is an album released in 1996 by American singer Frank Sinatra. It comprises his renditions of Cole Porter songs.

Track listing
All songs written by Cole Porter.

"I've Got You Under My Skin" - 3:43
"I Concentrate on You" - 2:23
"What Is This Thing Called Love?" - 2:35
"You Do Something to Me" - 1:33
"At Long Last Love" - 2:23
"Anything Goes" - 2:43
"Night and Day" - 3:58
"Just One of Those Things" - 3:14
"I Get a Kick Out of You" - 2:56
"You'd Be So Nice to Come Home To" - 2:07
"I Love Paris" - 1:49
"From This Moment On" - 3:50
"C'est Magnifique" - 2:01
"It's All Right With Me" - 4:16
"Mind if I Make Love to You?" - 2:17
"You're Sensational" - 3:09

Personnel
 Frank Sinatra - vocals
 Nelson Riddle - arranger, conductor

1996 compilation albums
Frank Sinatra compilation albums
Cole Porter tribute albums